Bromperidol decanoate, sold under the brand names Bromidol Depot, Bromodol Decanoato, and Impromen Decanoas, is an antipsychotic which has been marketed in Europe and Latin America. It is an antipsychotic ester and long-acting prodrug of bromperidol which is administered by depot intramuscular injection once every 4 weeks.

See also
 List of antipsychotics § Antipsychotic esters

References

4-Phenylpiperidines
Aromatic ketones
Bromoarenes
Butyrophenone antipsychotics
Decanoate esters
Fluoroarenes
Prodrugs
Tertiary alcohols
Typical antipsychotics